HaJaBaRaLa, or HJBRL: A Nonsense Story, is a children's novella by Sukumar Ray. Ha Ja Ba Ra La is considered one of the best nonsense stories of Bengali literature. To highlight its genre, artistic merit and style, it is frequently compared to Alice In Wonderland.

Plot
The story starts with a child, the narrator, suddenly waking up from sleep and finding that the handkerchief they had placed just beside them before sleeping has turned into a cat. The child starts talking to the cat, who speaks nonsensically about a handkerchief before disappearing over the hedge. Then the child finds Kakeshwar doing mathematical calculations on a slate, that appears very unusual to the narrator. 

This includes multiplication that is purely illogical and fallacious. After arguing over math, a goat appears and narrates his life about eating paper and other artificial things. Hijibijbij appears and laughs hysterically at improbable situations and keeps changing his mind about the names of his family members. Then many animals appear, and confusion results. The child wakes up from their odd dream and finds the cat, which does not talk.

Characters
Most of the characters have found idiomatic usage in Bengali language, which is true for many of Ray's works.

Some of the main characters are:

Shree Kakkeshwar kuchkuche A raven/crow who wears a clerk's green eyeshade while performing mathematics.

Gechhodada A character that is only alluded to by the cat but never appears in the story. he is completely unpredictable, and according to the cat, can only be found solving a very complicated, irrational and nonsensical mathematics, which depends on many probabilities about where Gechodada can be that moment.

HeejibeejbeejA person who imagines very improbable situations and laughs at them.
Sheyal  The fox and the advocate against Kumir
Byakaran Shing BA KhadyabisharadA goat who delivers academic lectures on non-academic subjects, such as what goats do not eat.
Pyancha  The owl judge in the court

Udhho and Budhho dwarf-like creatures who are fighting one moment and hugging the next. The phrase "Udhor pindi Budhor ghare", meaning (but not literally translated to) "the shoe is on the other foot", has become a very common idiom.
Shojaru  A porcupine who makes a court case for insult
Kumir  A crocodile, the advocate of Shojaru
Beraal A nonsense cat who speaks about nonsense things like gechodada (grandpa tree) and other people.
Nera A person who has no hair. He loves to sing nonsense songs.
Gechhoboudi  Who dos not appear in the story but is the wife of gechhodada who cooks
Mejomama  Maternal uncle who finds everything about the story nonsense.

References

External links
 Wikisource page , illustrated 
 Transcript of HaJaBaRaLa 

1921 novels
Sukumar Ray
Novellas
Indian Bengali-language novels
1921 children's books
Indian children's novels
Children's novellas